Allisen Camille (born 26 June 1992) is a Seychellois badminton player. Camille competed at the 2010, 2014, and 2018 Commonwealth Games. She won two silvers and a bronze at the 2011 All-Africa Games in the women's doubles, mixed doubles, and team event respectively. Partnered with Juliette Ah-Wan, they secured the women's doubles gold medal at the 2015 All-Africa Games.

Achievements

All-Africa Games 
Women's doubles

Mixed doubles

African Championships 
Women's doubles

Mixed doubles

BWF International Challenge/Series
Women's doubles

Mixed doubles

 BWF International Challenge tournament
 BWF International Series tournament
 BWF Future Series tournament

References

External links
 
 
 
 
 
 

1992 births
Living people
People from Greater Victoria, Seychelles
Seychellois female badminton players
Badminton players at the 2010 Commonwealth Games
Badminton players at the 2014 Commonwealth Games
Badminton players at the 2018 Commonwealth Games
Commonwealth Games competitors for Seychelles
Competitors at the 2011 All-Africa Games
Competitors at the 2015 African Games
Competitors at the 2019 African Games
African Games gold medalists for Seychelles
African Games silver medalists for Seychelles
African Games bronze medalists for Seychelles
African Games medalists in badminton
20th-century Seychellois people
21st-century Seychellois people